McBride station is on the Canadian National Railway mainline in McBride, British Columbia. The station is served by Via Rail's Jasper–Prince Rupert train.

History
When originally built by the Grand Trunk Pacific Railway in 1919, the layout of the station was a -story wood building with park land on both sides, in keeping with its role as a railway centre and divisional point on the line.

It became a federally Designated Heritage Railway Station in 1991.

See also

 List of designated heritage railway stations of Canada

References

External links 
Via Rail Station Description

Via Rail stations in British Columbia
Designated Heritage Railway Stations in British Columbia
Railway stations in Canada opened in 1919
1919 establishments in British Columbia